Jane Adams (born 1965) is an American actress. She made her Broadway debut in the original production of I Hate Hamlet in 1991, and won the Tony Award for Best Featured Actress in a Play for the 1994 revival of An Inspector Calls. Her film roles include Happiness (1998), Wonder Boys (2000), Eternal Sunshine of the Spotless Mind (2004), and Little Children (2006). She also had a recurring role on the NBC sitcom Frasier (1999–2000), and was nominated for the 2010 Golden Globe Award for Best Supporting Actress on Television for the HBO series Hung (2009–11).

Early life
Jane Adams was born in Washington, DC, the daughter of Janice, an administrative assistant, and William Adams, an engineer. She has a younger brother, Jonathan, and was raised in Wheaton, Illinois, and Bellevue, Washington. 

Adams attended the University of Washington, where she studied political science, and the Cornish College of the Arts, where she took theater. She attended the Juilliard School's Drama Division (1985–1989, Group 18) where she graduated with a Bachelor of Fine Arts degree in 1989.

Career
Adams performed theatre at the Seattle Repertory Theatre. She turned down the chance to work in Sister Act with Whoopi Goldberg for the opportunity to work with Arthur Miller onstage.

She worked with Steve Martin and Diane Keaton in Father of the Bride Part II. She went back to the stage and won the 1994 Tony Award for best performance by a featured actress in a play for the Broadway revival of An Inspector Calls. She also won the Outer Critics Circle Award for best debut performance in a play in the Broadway production of Paul Rudnick's I Hate Hamlet.

In 1996, Adams portrayed Karen Lukens in the ABC-TV drama series Relativity. 

In 1998, she starred in the misanthropic dark comedy Happiness with Philip Seymour Hoffman, playing the role of Joy, a sensitive single woman who is struggling with life. She and the cast won many ensemble awards. The next year, Adams got a recurring role on the comedy series Frasier from 1999 to 2000. She played Dr. Mel Karnofsky, who became Niles Crane's second wife. She also had a role in the 1999 film Mumford.

In 2001, she was in the independent film titled Songcatcher, with Janet McTeer. She and the cast won a Sundance Special Jury Prize. She also portrayed Reeva Baines Eidenberg in the CBS drama series Citizen Baines. 

In 2007, she appeared in The Sensation of Sight and The Brave One. In the latter film, she appeared opposite Jodie Foster, Terrence Howard, Mary Steenburgen and Naveen Andrews.

From 2009–2011, Adams co-starred in the HBO series Hung opposite Thomas Jane. She starred in and co-wrote the 2012 film All the Light in the Sky with director Joe Swanberg.

Filmography

Film

Television

Theatre

References

External links
 
 
 

1965 births
Living people
20th-century American actresses
21st-century American actresses
Actresses from Washington, D.C.
American film actresses
American stage actresses
American television actresses
Cornish College of the Arts alumni
Juilliard School alumni
Actors from Wheaton, Illinois
University of Washington College of Arts and Sciences alumni
Tony Award winners
Drama Desk Award winners
Actresses from Washington (state)
People from Bellevue, Washington